This is a list of breweries in Scotland. Beer has been produced in Scotland for approximately 5,000 years. The Celtic tradition of using bittering herbs remained in Scotland longer than the rest of Europe. Most breweries developed in the Central Lowlands, which also contained the main centres of population. Scottish brewing reached a peak of 280 breweries in 1840. The merger of breweries led to changes, the higher hop content of some of the beers allowed them to travel better than previous products thus creating a higher quality product for export. Edinburgh and Alloa in particular became noted centres for the export of beer around the world. By 1920, there were only 62 brewers left. The decline continued so that by 1960 there were only 26 and by 1970, they had dropped to just 11.

At the end of the twentieth century, small breweries had begun to spring up all over Scotland and the decline was reversed. The CAMRA Good Beer Guide 2015 states that Scotland is home to 80 breweries.

Operational breweries

A-C
 6° North Brewery, Stonehaven, Aberdeenshire
Alechemy, Livingston
 The Alpha Project Brewery, Edinburgh 
 Andrews Ales, Cummertrees 
 Arran Brewery, Isle of Arran
 Ayr Brewing Company, Ayr
 Barney's Beer, Edinburgh 
 Beath Brewing, Cowdenbeath
 Beeches Brewery, Lochgelly 
 Belhaven Brewery, Dunbar
 Black Isle Brewery, Munlochy
 Black Metal, Loanhead
 Black Wolf,  Stirling
 Born in the Borders Brewery, Jedburgh
 BrewDog, Fraserburgh and Ellon
 Brewmeister, Aboyne, Aberdeenshire
 Broughton Ales, Biggar
 Cairngorm Brewery, Aviemore 
 Caledonian Brewery,   Edinburgh 
 Campervan Brewery,  Leith, Edinburgh
 Clockwork Beer, Glasgow
 Coul Brewing Company, Glenrothes
 Cromarty Brewing, Cromarty
 Cuillin Brewery, Isle of Skye

D-I
 Deeside Brewery, Banchory Aberdeenshire
 Drygate Brewery, Glasgow
 Eden Brewery St Andrews, Guardbridge, St Andrews
 Edinbrew Brewery, Edinburgh
 Edinburgh Beer Factory, Edinburgh
 Ethical Ales, Mauchline
 Fallen Brewing, Stirling
 The Ferry Brewery, South Queensferry, Edinburgh
 Fierce Beer, Aberdeen
 Five Kingdoms Brewery, Newton Stewart
 Freewheelin Brewery, Peebles
 Fyfe Brewing Company, Kirkcaldy 
 Fyne Ales, Cairndow, Argyll 
 Harviestoun Brewery,   Alva, Clackmannanshire 
 Hebridean Brewing Company, Stornoway, Isle of Lewis
 Highland Brewing Company, Orkney 
Houston Brewing Company, Houston, Renfrewshire
 Hybrid Brewing, Grangemouth
Innis & Gunn, Edinburgh (brewed in Glasgow by Wellpark Brewery)
 Inveralmond Brewery, Perth 
 Isle of Skye Brewing Company, Isle of Skye

J-Q
 Jaw Brew, Glasgow
 John o' Groats Brewery, John o' Groats
 Kelburn Brewery, Barrhead, East Renfrewshire 
 Kinneil Brew Hoose, Bo'ness
 Knops Beer Company, Edinburgh 
 Lade Inn Brewery, Callander
 Lawman Brewing, Glasgow
 Lerwick Brewery, Lerwick
 Loch Lomond Brewery, Alexandria, West Dunbartonshire
 Loch Ness Brewery, Drumnadrochit
 Lola Rose Brewery, Wanlockhead
 Monolith Brewery, Glasgow
 MòR Brewing, Dundee
 Odyssey Brothers, Edinburgh 
 Old Worthy Brewing Company, Hebrides 
Orkney Brewery, Sinclair Breweries, Orkney 
 Overtone Brewing co, Glasgow
 Pilot Beer, Leith

R-Z
 Scottish Borders Brewery, Ancrum
 Shilling Brewing Company, Glasgow
 Spey Valley Brewery, Mulben
 Speyside Craft Brewery, Forres 
 St Andrews Brewing, St Andrews
 Stewart Brewing, Edinburgh
 Strathaven Ales, Strathaven
 StrathBraan Brewery, Dunkeld
 Sugar Pine Brewing, Dunbar
 Sulwath Brewers, Castle Douglas
 Swannay Brewery, Orkney
 Tempest Brew Co, Kelso
 Tinpot Brewery, Bridge of Allan
 Top Out Brewery, Loanhead
 Traditional Scottish Ales, Stirling
 Traquair House Brewery, Peebles
 Tryst Brewery, Falkirk
 Valhalla Brewery, Shetland
 Wellpark Brewery (Tennent's, Innis & Gunn), Glasgow
 West, Glasgow
 Wigtown Brewery,  Wigtown
 Williams Brothers Brewing Company, Alloa
 Windswept Brewing, Lossiemouth 
 Wooha Brewing, Nairn

Defunct breweries 

 Alice Brewery, Inverness 1983-1988
 Atlas Brewery, Kinlochleven 2002-2004
 Devanha Brewery, Aberdeen 1982-1984
 Glaschu Brewery, Glasgow 1994-1996
 Holyrood Brewery, Edinburgh 11th century - 1986 
 Maclays Brewery, Alloa 1830-2001
 McEwan's, Edinburgh 1856-2008
 Scottish & Newcastle, Edinburgh 1749-2004
 Strathalbyn Brewers, Clydebank 1982-1987 
 Younger's, Edinburgh 1778-1931

Champion Beer of Scotland 
The Champion Beer of Scotland (also known as CBOS) is an award for Scottish beers presented by the Campaign for Real Ale (CAMRA), at their annual Scottish Traditional Beer Festival in Edinburgh.

See also

 Beer in the United Kingdom
 Beer and breweries by region
 Beer in England
 List of breweries in England
 Beer in Northern Ireland
 Beer in Wales

References

External links
 Scottish Beer & Pub Association
 Society of Independent Brewers
 CAMRA

Scotland
 
Scotland
Lists of buildings and structures in Scotland
Scottish cuisine-related lists